The 2015 Ykkönen began on 2 May 2015 and ended on 17 October 2015. The winning team qualified directly for promotion to the 2016 Veikkausliiga 2016, while the second-placed team had to play a play-off against the eleventh-placed team from Veikkausliiga to decide who would play in that division. The bottom two teams were relegated to Kakkonen.

Overview

A total of ten teams contested in the league, including five sides from the 2014 season, TPS who was relegated from Veikkausliiga, EIF and PS Kemi who promoted from Kakkonen after winning the promotion play-offs, VIFK, the winner of Kakkonen 2014 Western Group as a replacement for promoted Ilves and MP, the runner-up Kakkonen 2014 Eastern Group as a replacement for MYPA.

FC Viikingit and JIPPO were relegated from 2014 Ykkönen.

HIFK, the champion of 2014 Ykkönen, KTP, the runner-up of 2014 Ykkönen, and Ilves, which finished third in Ykkönen were promoted to the 2015 Veikkausliiga.

Managerial changes

League table

Results

Matches 1–18

Matches 19–27

Statistics

Top scorers
Source: palloliitto.fi

Monthly awards

See also
 2015 Veikkausliiga
 2015 Kakkonen

References

External links
 Official site 

Ykkönen seasons
2
Fin
Fin